The Hagerstown–Martinsburg Metropolitan Area, officially designated by the United States Office of Management and Budget (OMB) as Hagerstown–Martinsburg, Maryland–West Virginia Metropolitan Statistical Area (MSA), constitutes the primary cities of Hagerstown, Maryland; Martinsburg, West Virginia; and surrounding areas in three counties: Washington County, Maryland; Berkeley County, West Virginia; and Morgan County, West Virginia. The metro area lies mainly within the rich, fertile Cumberland and Shenandoah valleys, and is approximately a 60–90 minute drive from Washington, D.C.; Baltimore, Maryland; and Harrisburg, Pennsylvania; Hagerstown is approximately  driving distance from all three cities. The population of the metropolitan area as of 2008 is 263,753.

Counties

Communities
Washington County (2008 population estimate 145,384)

City:
 Hagerstown (Primary City) (2017 population estimate 140,728)

Towns:
Boonsboro
Clear Spring
Funkstown
Hancock
Keedysville
Sharpsburg
Smithsburg
Williamsport

Census Designated Places (CDPs):

Cavetown
Chewsville
Fort Ritchie
Fountainhead-Orchard Hills
Halfway
Highfield-Cascade
Leitersburg

Maugansville
Mount Aetna
Mount Lena
Paramount-Long Meadow
Robinwood
Rohrersville
Saint James

San Mar
Wilson-Conococheague

Other unincorporated communities:
Antietam
Beaver Creek
Benevola

Big Pool
Broadfording
Brownsville
Burtner
Cearfoss
Cedar Grove
Dargan

Downsville
Eakles Mills
Fairplay
Fairview
Gapland
Huyett
Indian Springs

Jugtown
Mapleville
Mercersville
Pecktonville
Pen Mar
Pinesburg
Ringgold

Samples Manor
Sandy Hook
Spielman
Trego
Van Lear
Weverton
Woodmont

Berkeley County (2008 population estimate 102,044)

City:
 Martinsburg (Primary City) (2008 population estimate 17,020)
Town:
Hedgesville

Unincorporated communities:

Morgan County (2008 population estimate 16,325)

Towns:
Bath (Berkeley Springs)
Paw Paw

Unincorporated communities:

Urban areas
The metropolitan area contains parts of or all of the following Urbanized Areas and Urban Clusters (that are likewise designated by the OMB) within its boundaries:
 Hagerstown, MD–WV–PA Urbanized Area (2000 Census population 120,326) (part)
 Waynesboro, PA-MD Urban Cluster (2000 population 22,140) (part)
 Inwood, WV Urban Cluster (2000 population 7,784) (all)
 Boonsboro, MD Urban Cluster (2000 population 3,412) (all)

Geography

The MSA is roughly bordered to the east by South Mountain, to the west by Sideling Hill, to the north by the Mason–Dixon line, and to the south by Northern Virginia. The Potomac River runs from west to east through the heart of the metro area with tributaries including Sideling Hill Creek, Conococheague Creek, and Antietam Creek. Terrain in the region is very well-suited and used for dairy farming, cornfields, and fruit orchards. Some undeveloped deciduous forestry also exists, especially in the mountainous portions of the area. However, much of the region's land is becoming increasingly threatened by urban sprawl.

Hagerstown and Martinsburg are situated in the transition between the humid subtropical climate zone (Köppen Cfa) and the humid continental climate zone (Köppen Dfa), with hot, humid summers and cool to moderately cold winters where average annual snowfall is around 20 inches and temperatures below  are annual occurrences.

Demographics
The metropolitan area's population in 2000 was 222,771. The 2008 estimate is 263,753, making Greater Hagerstown-Martinsburg the 169th largest metropolitan area in the United States. The growth rate from 2000 to 2008 is +18.4%, meaning that the metro area is the 48th fastest growing MSA (out of 363 total MSAs) in the entire country and the most rapidly growing in Maryland and West Virginia from 2000 to 2008. Metropolitan Hagerstown-Martinsburg also registered a higher net numerical population gain from 2006 to 2007 than Baltimore-Towson, MD MSA during the same time period. Much of the growth is due to the influx of people from Washington, D.C. and, to a lesser extent, Baltimore.

Transportation

Major highways

Airports

Hagerstown Regional Airport , also known as Richard A. Henson Field provides passenger service for the Hagerstown Metro Area residents

The Eastern West Virginia Regional Airport , just south of Martinsburg is a designated general aviation reliever facility and also home to the West Virginia Air National Guard's 167th Airlift Wing flying the C-17 Globemaster III.

Mass transit
 MARC Train and Amtrak (Martinsburg)
 Greyhound and Atlantic Charter Buses
 County Commuter (Hagerstown-Washington County)
 Eastern Panhandle Transit Authority "Pan Tran" (Martinsburg-Berkeley County-Jefferson County)
 Miller Cabs, Downtown Taxi! and Turner Vans (Hagerstown)

Education and healthcare

Colleges and universities
 Antietam Bible College, Biblical Seminary, and Graduate School, Hagerstown
 Hagerstown Community College
 Kaplan University, Hagerstown Campus (former)
 Mount Saint Mary's University, Hagerstown Campus
 University System of Maryland at Hagerstown
 Vinayaka Missions America University, Hagerstown
 Blue Ridge Community and Technical College, Martinsburg
 James Rumsey Technical Institute, Martinsburg
 Valley College of Technology, Martinsburg Campus
 University of Charleston Martinsburg Campus
 Shepherd University Martinsburg Center
Kee Mar College, former women's college

Hospitals
 Brook Lane Psychiatric Center – Hagerstown
 Meritus Hospital – Hagerstown
 Western Maryland Hospital Center – Hagerstown
 Berkeley Medical Center – Martinsburg
 Veterans Affairs Medical Center – Martinsburg
 Veterans Affairs Community Based Outpatient Clinic – Hagerstown
 War Memorial Hospital – Berkeley Springs

Media

Radio

Television

WDVM-TV 25 (IND)

WWPB 31 (MPT/PBS)

WWPX 60 (ION)

Major newspapers
The Herald-Mail, Hagerstown
The Journal, Martinsburg

See also
 Maryland census statistical areas
 West Virginia census statistical areas
 Table of United States Metropolitan Statistical Areas (MSAs)
 Table of United States Core Based Statistical Areas (CBSAs)
 Table of United States primary census statistical areas (PCSAs)

References

External links
Hagerstown-Washington County Convention & Visitor's Bureau
Hagerstown-Washington County Chamber of Commerce
Martinsburg-Berkeley County Convention & Visitors Bureau
Chamber of Commerce of Martinsburg and Berkeley County
MorganCountyUSA
Berkeley Springs-Morgan County Chamber of Commerce

 
Hagerstown
Metropolitan areas of Maryland
Metropolitan areas of West Virginia